Alexandra Gummer (born 10 September 1992) is an Australian football (soccer) player, who plays for BSC Young Boys in the Swiss Nationalliga A. She previously played in the Australian W-League for Melbourne Victory  and Adelaide United and in the English FA WSL for Doncaster Rovers Belles. Gummer has also been involved with WNPL Victoria side South Melbourne FC during the W-League off-season since 2017.

References

External links
 
 

1992 births
Living people
Australian women's soccer players
Adelaide United FC (A-League Women) players
Melbourne Victory FC (A-League Women) players
Doncaster Rovers Belles L.F.C. players
A-League Women players
Women's Super League players
Expatriate women's footballers in England
Australian expatriate sportspeople in England
Women's association football defenders
Australian expatriate sportspeople in Switzerland